Leonid Georgievich Yengibarov (March 15, 1935 – July 25, 1972) was a Soviet Armenian clown and actor.

Biography 
Leonid Yengibarov was born in Moscow to an Armenian father and a Russian mother. He started his career as a boxer. In 1955 he joined the State School of Circus Art, Clownship department. He graduated from Circus school with skills in juggling, acrobatics, and hand balancing. After graduation in 1959 he moved to Yerevan and joined the Armenian state circus.

He was one of the first Soviet clowns to create the poetic, intellectual clownery, which made spectators think, not only laugh. Leonid Yengibarov, 'the clown with sad eyes', revolutionized the art of clownery by introducing lyrical tones into traditional buffoonery and grotesque sequences. According to the Spectacle journal, he has shown the direction. He was the innovator. He began to do clown gags that were not funny, but very sad. They ended sadly. He felt that life was not funny anymore.

After initial incomprehension, his popularity grew immensely. After that he was invited to work in cinema. His first film, A Path to the Arena, was in fact about himself.

By the end of the 1960s he was known as one of the best clowns in the country and in the countries of the Eastern bloc, where he was permitted to travel. His circus career came to a halt in 1971: he left the State Circus when his partner was banned from international touring.  He created a Variety Pantomime Theatre (Estradniy teatr pantomimi) instead. However officially he was forbidden to call his company “theatre”, only allowed to use the term “troupe” (ансамбль). He managed to stage only a single piece, “Star Rain” before his untimely death from a massive heart attack.

His work continues influencing other artists including Slava Polunin.

His friend Vladimir Vysotsky wrote a shrill poem "To memory of the actor; To Yengibarov from the audience". Alla Pugacheva dedicated her song "Arlekino" to Yengibarov: "He was my favourite clown and even died while working. Just think: he died from laughter".

Filmography

Films about him
Please meet Leonid Yengibarov, Знакомьтесь: Леонид Енгибаров
2 Leonid 2, 2 Леонид 2

Honors
 The E. Bass Cup (first prize) of the 1964 European Clown Competition in Prague;
 People's Artist of Armenia (1971).

See also
Yerevan Circus

References

External links

Male actors from Moscow
Russian clowns
Soviet clowns
Ethnic Armenian male actors
Soviet male actors
Burials at Vagankovo Cemetery
Russian people of Armenian descent
1935 births
1972 deaths
Russian mimes